The Yauco Battle Site is the site of the Battle of Yauco between Spanish and American forces in the municipality of Guánica, Puerto Rico on July 25 and 26, 1898. It was the site of the first major confrontation in the Puerto Rican Campaign of the Spanish–American War. 

A  area was listed on the National Register of Historic Places in 2008.  Non-contributing elements in the listed area include a portion of SR 166R, a 20th-century bridge, and Hacienda Quiñones' main house.

References

National Register of Historic Places in Puerto Rico
Conflict sites on the National Register of Historic Places
Spanish–American War
Guánica, Puerto Rico
1898 in Puerto Rico